Darryl Wills (born August 19, 1961) is an American racing driver from Alvin, Texas.

Wills began sprint car racing in 2004 and competed in a World of Outlaws race in 2005. In 2008, he began racing in SCCA Formula Mazda competition with Hillenburg Motorsports, later finishing third at the SCCA National Championship Runoffs in 2009 and winning the Formula Mazda championship in the event in 2010. He won the Formula Mazda class at the June Sprints in 2011. Two more National Championships in 2011 and 2013 with the SCCA National Championship Runoffs. Other accolades include two time AJ Foyt Driver of the year, two time winner of the prestigious Triple Crown Trophy and two time recipient of the SCCA Super Sweep Award.

Hillenburg Motorsports purchased two Firestone Indy Lights cars in November 2011 for Wills to compete in that series in 2012. The combination competed in the first three races of the season with a best finish of tenth in the season opener in St. Petersburg. Wills finished 16th in points.

Wills currently resides in Houston, Texas.

Racing record

SCCA National Championship Runoffs

American open–wheel racing results 
(key)

Indy Lights

References

External links

1961 births
Racing drivers from Texas
People from Alvin, Texas
Indy Lights drivers
Living people
SCCA National Championship Runoffs winners
Indy Pro 2000 Championship drivers